is a pseudonym for the collective contributions of the Sunrise animation staff.

Name
"Hajime Yatate" is considered to be named after a quote of Matsuo Bashō's Oku no Hosomichi:

Credited series

 The various Gundam series
 Trider G7 (1980)
 Aura Battler Dunbine (1983)
 Choriki Robo Galatt (1984)
 Yoroiden Samurai Troopers AKA Ronin Warriors (1988)
 Mashin Hero Wataru (1988)
 Mama wa Shōgaku 4 Nensei (1992)
 The Vision of Escaflowne (1996)
 Cowboy Bebop (1998)
 Infinite Ryvius (1999)
 Z-Mind (1999)
 Witch Hunter Robin (2002)
 Machine Robo Rescue (2003)
 My-HiME (2004)
 Idolmaster: Xenoglossia (2007)
 The Girl Who Leapt Through Space (2009)
 Sacred Seven (2011)
 Love Live! School Idol Project (2013)
 Love Live! Sunshine!! (Season 2, 2017)

See also
Collective pseudonyms under the Toei Group:
 Saburō Yatsude
 Izumi Todo

References

External links 
 

House names
Japanese animators
Sunrise (company) people